Keupstraße is a station on line 4 of the Cologne Stadtbahn.

References

See also
List of Cologne KVB stations

Cologne KVB stations